The Thunder River Rapids Ride was a river rapid type water ride located in the Town of Gold Rush section of the Dreamworld theme park on the Gold Coast, Queensland, Australia. 

After four riders were killed on it in late October 2016, the ride was closed. On 9 November 2016, Ardent Leisures' CEO announced that the ride would not reopen, and was to be demolished. In October 2017, police recommended that no criminal charges be laid against any person in relation to the deaths.

History
Gold Rush Country (now known as the Town of Gold Rush) opened on 11 December, 1986. The area featured the Eureka Mountain Mine Ride and the Thunder River Rapids Ride. Although resembling an Intamin River rapids ride, Thunder River Rapids was neither built nor supplied by Intamin. A Sydney-based company was commissioned to supply the vessels in 1983. The Thunder River Rapids Ride was among the most popular rides at Dreamworld until its closure.

Characteristics
At the time of closure, Thunder River Rapids Ride was one of Dreamworld’s nine family rides alongside Dreamworld Express, Escape from Madagascar, Gingy’s Glider, MAD Jungle Jam, Rocky Hollow Log Ride, Shockwave, Skadoosh Bumper Cars, Vintage Car Adventure. The ride consisted of several circular rafts which can carry up to 6 riders each.

An entire cycle on the Thunder River Rapids Ride lasted approximately 4 minutes.

Ride experience

Queue
Riders entered a long indoor queue with several switchbacks. The queue then bridged across part of the ride's water storage area before reaching the circular station. This station originally featured a rotating platform which allowed riders to mount and dismount the boats without the need for the boats to stop.

Ride
Riders would board one of several six-person circular rafts. The raft was dispatched and the riders travelled back past the ride's queue and into a cave. Upon exiting the cave, riders experienced the main rapids section of the ride. This section ran alongside a large water catchment which contained the water storage for the Thunder River Rapids Ride. The raft then went under the Eureka Mountain Mine Ride's station and headed back towards its own station. Before departing the ride, guests were brought back up to the level of the station by a conveyor belt.

2016 incident

On 25 October 2016, a malfunction of the Thunder River Rapids Ride resulted in the deaths of four people. This is regarded as the worst accident at an Australian theme park since the 1979 Sydney Ghost Train fire at Luna Park Sydney. Due to the failure of one of the two large water pumps essential for the ride's operation, the water level in the ride dropped quickly causing a raft, which was occupied by six guests, to become stranded on support rails near the end of the raft conveyor and unable to reach the unloading area. Approximately one minute later, another raft carrying six passengers moved down the conveyor and collided with the first stranded raft. Both rafts pivoted upwards driven by movement of the conveyor before the first raft fell back to a level position resting on support rails. The second raft was further moved by the conveyor into a vertical position and subsequently caused passengers to either fall out of the raft or become trapped in close proximity to the conveyor mechanism leading to fatal injuries for four passengers. The other two passengers, both children, were able to climb out of the raft, still in its vertical orientation, to nearby platforms once the conveyor had been shut down by ride staff. They were reportedly both physically unharmed however they were sent to hospital and offered counselling. 
Park operators stopped the ride and started draining the river, over 7 paramedic crews responded to the 000 call along with firefighters and police. The bodies were badly disfigured from crush and compression injuries. The recovery of the bodies went on into the early hours of the next morning with some paramedics requiring counselling due to the trauma of the scene.

Dreamworld released a statement on their website and Facebook page stating:

Dreamworld announced that the park would reopen on 28 October for a special memorial service for the victims. However, the reopening to the public was subject to discussions with Queensland police as the ride was being treated as a crime scene. The 28 October reopening was cancelled on 27 October.

Gold Coast Mayor Tom Tate offered his condolences to the families of those affected and extended any support financially and emotionally to all those involved. The then Australian Prime Minister Malcolm Turnbull offered his condolences and support, releasing a statement via Twitter; "I'm very saddened by the tragedy at Dreamworld today. Our thoughts and prayers are with the families."

On 29 October, the Queensland Government announced a 'blitz' of safety inspections, and an audit of state workplace health and safety laws.

The Busch Gardens Tampa theme park in Florida, United States shut its Congo River Rapids ride in response to the incident, until the cause was determined. However, it was later reopened on 26 October after a review and safety check was completed.

Permanent closure 
On 9 November, Ardent Leisure chief executive Deborah Thomas announced that the ride would be permanently closed, out of respect to the victims and their families, and that they would be invited to help create a memorial in its place.  The ride was later dismantled and the location fenced off.

In a report to the Queensland Coroner in October 2017, Police recommended that no criminal charges be laid against any person.

Coroner's report 
The Queensland Coroner, James McDougall, released a report on 24 February 2020 detailing "irresponsible", "dangerous" and "inadequate" safety practices at the theme park that contributed to the four deaths, while recommending the Queensland office of industrial relations consider a prosecution. The ride had endured frequent breakdowns in the days leading up to the accident, and had several design and construction issues which contributed.

and that:

Charges 
On 21 July 2020, it was announced that three charges had been laid against Ardent Leisure, Dreamworld's parent company. The charges were filed by the Work Health and Safety prosecutor, under the Work Health and Safety Act, at the Brisbane Magistrates Court. The matter was first heard on July 29 in Southport Magistrates Court. On the day before the scheduled trial, on 28 July 2020, Ardent Leisure pleaded guilty in the action. Subsequently, in September 2020, they were fined $3.6m (US$2.8m) for the breach of the Work Health and Safety Act.  The final settlement amount for $2.1 million to the family of one of the victims.

Aftermath
Thunder River's remaining structures were demolished in 2018. On 23 August 2019, the park announced that a new roller coaster, Steel Taipan, would take its place in 2021 and also consume a portion of the area in use by the former Eureka Mountain Mine Ride. Ardent Leisure reportedly paid out more than $5 million in compensation to the victim’s family as well as to emergency responders and witnesses. A memorial garden for the victims was built near the site of the Thunder River Rapids Ride.

Notes

References

External links
 

Amusement rides introduced in 1986
Animatronic attractions
Dreamworld (Australia)
1986 establishments in Australia
2016 disestablishments in Australia
Amusement rides that closed in 2016
Amusement park accidents
Water rides manufactured by Dreamworld (Australia)